Henry Markell (February 7, 1792 Stone Arabia, Montgomery County, New York – August 30, 1831 Palatine, Montgomery Co., NY) was an American lawyer and politician from New York.

Life
He was the son of Congressman Jacob Markell (1770–1852). He attended the common schools, studied law, was admitted to the bar and practiced.

Markell was elected as an Adams man to the 19th and 20th United States Congresses, holding office from March 4, 1825, to March 3, 1829.

At the time of his death, he practiced at Oppenheim, and was buried at the cemetery in the area which in 1838 was separated from Oppenheim as the Town of St. Johnsville.

Sources

The New York State Register for 1831 by Edwin Williams (page 268)

1792 births
1831 deaths
19th-century American politicians
People from Palatine, New York
National Republican Party members of the United States House of Representatives from New York (state)